Carno is a closed railway station in Carno, on the Cambrian Line, that was part of the Newtown and Machynlleth Railway. The station was closed in 1965 as part of the Beeching Cuts though there are proposals to re-open it.

History
Carno station was opened by the Newtown and Machynlleth Railway which had been incorporated in 1857 to connect the Llanidloes and Newtown Railway with  via . The line was single with passing loops at Carno, Llanbrynmair and Cemmes Road.

The station was situated to the north of Carno, which had a population of 717 in 1901. Two platforms were provided with the main station buildings and generously sized goods shed situated on the down platform. A signal box with 24 levers was erected at the west end of the down platform; it had a staff of four throughout the 1930s. The station was closed to goods traffic on 29 July 1963 and to passenger traffic on 14 June 1965 following the recommendation for its closure in the Beeching Report.

The line remained open and the station buildings were incorporated into the adjacent Laura Ashley factory complex until its closure in 2005. The signal box remained in service until 21 October 1988 when automatic half barriers were introduced on the level crossing at the west end of the station.

Proposed re-opening

In 2002, the Carno Station Action Group was set up to campaign for the re-opening of the station. An independent report commissioned by the group about the re-opening of the station was positively met by Arriva Trains Wales and Network Rail.

In 2009 the Welsh Assembly agreed to examine the proposal as part of the Cambrian Rail Study.

In 2014, the Welsh Assembly confirmed Arriva Trains Wales and Network Rail broadly agreed with an independent report recommending the reopening of a station at Carno. However, a new station would need to be built as the original Victorian building (which was incorporated into the former Laura Ashley factory) is in private ownership.

In 2015, the Shrewsbury and Aberystwyth Rail Passenger Association released an aims document that mentions the possibility of reopening the station. Along with Bow Street and Hanwood stations.

In January 2016, Welsh Transport Minister Edwina Hart confirmed that Arriva Trains Wales and Network Rail agreed with the conclusions of an independent report in favour of the station's reopening.

On the 10th anniversary of the original petition to the Welsh Assembly, the Carno Station Action Group started a new petition to keep the pressure on the Assembly to reopen the station. The Cabinet Secretary for Economy and Infrastructure for the Welsh Assembly, Ken Skates, confirmed in a letter to the Carno Station Action group in October 2017 that Carno was on the list of stations to go forward to Stage Two of the New Stations Assessment Program.
Plans to reopen the station reached the third and final stage in September 2019 when the station was shortlisted for further assessment by Network Rail. If successful, plans for the station will progress to the funding stage.

References

External links
 Carno Station Action Group

Disused railway stations in Powys
Railway stations in Great Britain opened in 1863
Railway stations in Great Britain closed in 1965
Beeching closures in Wales
Former Cambrian Railway stations
Proposed railway stations in Wales